The 2012 Newfoundland and Labrador Scotties Tournament of Hearts, Newfoundland and Labrador's women's provincial curling championship, was held from January 18 to 22 at the ReMax Centre in St. John's, Newfoundland and Labrador. The winning team, of Heather Strong, represented Newfoundland and Labrador at the 2012 Scotties Tournament of Hearts in Red Deer, Alberta, where they finished with a 4–7 record.

Teams

Standings

*Phillips placed second by virtue of a win over Nichols and Devereaux

Results
All Times Are Local (Newfoundland Standard Time)

Draw 1
January 18, 12:30 PM

Draw 2
January 18, 9:00 PM

Draw 3
January 19, 1:30 PM

Draw 4
January 19, 9:00 PM

Draw 5
January 20, 1:00PM

Tiebreaker
January 20, 7:30PM

Playoffs

Semifinal
January 21, 1:00 PM

Final
January 21, 7:30 PM

References

Newfoundland and Labrador
Newfoundland and Labrador Scotties Tournament of Hearts
Sport in St. John's, Newfoundland and Labrador
Curling in Newfoundland and Labrador